The Engine Company Number One in Augusta, Georgia, at 452 Ellis St., was built in 1892.  It was listed on the National Register of Historic Places in 1988.

It is a red brick building which was the first fire station built for the City of Augusta's paid fire department.

References

Fire stations on the National Register of Historic Places in Georgia (U.S. state)
National Register of Historic Places in Augusta, Georgia
Italianate architecture in Georgia (U.S. state)
Romanesque Revival architecture in Georgia (U.S. state)
Fire stations completed in 1892
1892 establishments in Georgia (U.S. state)